Phoronis pallida is a species of marine horseshoe worm in the phylum Phoronida.

References

Phoronids
Animals described in 1862